Heroic may mean:
characteristic of a hero
typical of heroic poetry or of heroic verse
belonging to the Greek Heroic Age
Heroic (esports), a Danish esports organization
Heroic (horse), a racehorse
Heroic (film), a 2023 film by David Zonana

See also